Valeri Vladimirovich Tsvetkov (born 5 November 1977) is a Russian professional football coach and a former player. He made his professional debut in the Russian Second Division in 2000 for FC Pskov.

Honours
 Russian Premier League runner-up: 2003
 Russian Premier League bronze: 2001
 Top 33 year-end best players list: 2001
 Russian Cup finalist: 2002
 Russian Premier League Cup winner: 2003

European club competitions
FC Zenit St. Petersburg
 UEFA Intertoto Cup 2000: 8 games
 UEFA Cup 2002–03: 3 games

References

1977 births
Sportspeople from Pskov
Living people
Russian footballers
Association football defenders
Russian Premier League players
FC Zenit Saint Petersburg players